Edward T. Lewis, born in 1936, more commonly known as Ted Lewis, is a college administrator, educator and poet. He was the fourth President St. Mary's College of Maryland, serving from 1982 to 1996.

He is credited with leading St. Mary's College of Maryland to achieve official public honors college status, at the time only one of two such colleges in the nation. He is also credited with playing many key and decisive roles in transforming the school into a nationally prominent institution.

He was later President of the Pennsylvania Academy of the Fine Arts where he was credited for advancing the institution in numerous ways.

He was also a poet in his early life and has been widely published in literary magazines and newspapers.

Early life

Lewis was born and raised in Warwick, Rhode Island, the son of an insurance salesman who only had an eight grade education. He initially did not maintain an interest in higher education, dropping out of North Carolina State University without graduating. He then joined the army and served for two years during the Korean War.

Later he completed an undergraduate degree at Union College and them went on to earn a master's degrees from Boston University, where he was a teaching fellow, and later received a doctorate from the University of Denver.

Lewis has also been a lifelong poet and has been widely published in newspapers and literary magazines. He has published more than 500 poems and essays. As a young man he was also involved in circles of some very well known poets.

He later became a college educator and then moved on to work in college and university administration.

Legacy

Public Honors College designation for St. Mary's College of Maryland

It was under the leadership of Ted Lewis that the college rose to national prominence, securing the designation of "Public Honors College" for the school, which at the time was only one of two such public colleges in the nation. Lewis has been widely credited with overseeing an enormous advance of the institution in curriculum, faculty and student achievement, as well as national standing and recognition.  The school has since attained numerous top national rankings.

Edward T. Lewis Poetry Award

The Edward T. Lewis Poetry Award was established in his honor at St. Mary's College of Maryland.

Lewis Quadrangle

Also called the Lewis Quad, is a set of buildings on the campus of St. Mary's College of Maryland which are named in his honor.

Portraits of Lewis

 An oil painting of Lewis hangs in Calvert Hall, the main administration building of St. Mary's College of Maryland. It was painted by his son.
 There is a mixed-media, modern art portrait of Lewis, created at the Pennsylvania Academy of Fine Arts, where he served as President after his time of service at St. Mary's College. The portrait uses a technique sometimes called "digital impressionism".

References

St. Mary's College of Maryland faculty
1936 births
People from Warwick, Rhode Island
Living people